The 1938 Florida Gators football team represented the University of Florida during the 1938 college football season. The season was Josh Cody's third as the head coach of the Florida Gators football team. The highlights of the season included a 21–7 homecoming win over the Maryland Terrapins and a hard-fought 9–7 conference victory over the  teamAuburn Tigers in Jacksonville, Florida, and the first-time meeting with the future in-state rival Miami Hurricanes. Cody's 1938 Florida Gators finished 4–6–1 overall and 2–2–1 in the Southeastern Conference (SEC), placing seventh of thirteen SEC teams in the conference standings—Cody's best finish in the SEC.

The season ended with a 20–12 loss to Temple, Pop Warner's last victory.

Schedule

References

Florida
Florida Gators football seasons
Florida Gators football